Jorge Elgueta (born ) is a former Argentine male volleyball player and current coach. He was part of the Argentina men's national volleyball team. He competed with the national team at the 1996 Summer Olympics in Atlanta, USA and at the 2004 Summer Olympics in Athens, Greece.

See also
 Argentina at the 2004 Summer Olympics

References

External links
Jorge Elgueta at sports-reference.com

1969 births
Living people
Argentine men's volleyball players
Olympiacos S.C. players
E.A. Patras players
A.C. Orestias players
Place of birth missing (living people)
Volleyball players at the 1996 Summer Olympics
Volleyball players at the 2004 Summer Olympics
Olympic volleyball players of Argentina
Pan American Games medalists in volleyball
Pan American Games gold medalists for Argentina
Medalists at the 1995 Pan American Games
21st-century Argentine people